The men's 1500 metres competition of the Short track speed skating at the 2015 Winter Universiade was held at the Universiade Igloo, Granada on February 11.

Results

Heats
 Q — qualified for Semifinals
 ADV — advanced
 PEN — penalty

Semifinals
 QA — qualified for Finals A
 QB — qualified for Finals B
 ADV — advanced
 PEN — penalty

Finals

Final B (classification round)

Final A (medal round)

Men's 1500